Fred Emerich is an American politician and a Republican member of the Wyoming Senate representing District 5 since January 11, 2011.

Education
Emerich earned his BS in microbiology from the University of Wyoming and his DMV from Colorado State University.

Elections
2010 When Republican Senator Bob Fecht left the Legislature and left the District 5 seat open, Emerich was unopposed for the August 17, 2010 Republican Primary, winning with 2,707 votes (51.2%), and won the November 2, 2010 General election with 3,002 votes (49.6%) against Democratic nominee Lori Millin.
2014: Emerich was unopposed in the general election on November 4, 2014, and won a second 4-year term.

References

External links
Official page at the Wyoming Legislature
 

Place of birth missing (living people)
Year of birth missing (living people)
Living people
Colorado State University alumni
Politicians from Cheyenne, Wyoming
University of Wyoming alumni
Republican Party Wyoming state senators
21st-century American politicians